Tholicode  is a village in Vithura Thiruvananthapuram district in the state of Kerala, India.

Demographics
 India census, Tholicode had a population of 31784 with 14925 males and 16859 females.

References

Villages in Thiruvananthapuram district